The 2000 European Promotion Cup for Women was the sixth edition of the basketball European Promotion Cup for Women, today known as FIBA Women's European Championship for Small Countries. The tournament took place in Ohrid, Republic of Macedonia, from 14 to 18 June 2000. Macedonia women's national basketball team won the tournament for the first time.

Venue
Biljanini Izvori Sports Hall

Participating teams

Final standings

Results

References

FIBA Women's European Championship for Small Countries
Promotion Cup
International sports competitions hosted by North Macedonia
Basketball in North Macedonia
European Promotion Cup for Women